Olenecamptus bilobus is a species of beetle in the family Cerambycidae. It was described by Johan Christian Fabricius in 1801, originally under the genus Saperda. It is known from Bhutan,  Myanmar, India, Papua New Guinea, Indonesia, Laos, Seychelles, Madagascar, Australia, Sri Lanka, Japan, Sumatra, Java, Philippines and Taiwan.

Subspecies
 Olenecamptus bilobus bilobus (Fabricius, 1801)
 Olenecamptus bilobus dahli Kriesche, 1926
 Olenecamptus bilobus luzonensis Dillon & Dillon, 1948
 Olenecamptus bilobus madecassus Fairmaire, 1901
 Olenecamptus bilobus nipponensis Dillon & Dillon, 1948
 Olenecamptus bilobus taiwanus Dillon & Dillon, 1948
 Olenecamptus bilobus trimaculatus Breuning, 1940

References

Dorcaschematini
Beetles described in 1801